Arnold Mvuemba Makengo (born 28 January 1985) is a French-Congolese professional footballer who plays as a midfielder for Roeselare in the Belgian First Division B.

Club career
Mvuemba was born in Alençon, Orne, France. He was signed by Premier League team Portsmouth on loan from Stade Rennais in January 2007 until May 2007, with an option to complete a permanent deal. He made his debut against Blackburn Rovers on 25 February 2007, and scored his first Premier League goal on 9 April 2007 in a 4–2 defeat to Watford. On 3 July, Mvuemba signed a three-year contract with Portsmouth for an undisclosed fee. Mvuemba was part of Portsmouth's 2007–08 FA Cup-winning team. Despite not making the squad for the final he appeared in the earlier rounds. He scored against VfL Wolfsburg in the UEFA Cup but it was not enough to enable Portsmouth to remain in the competition. On 7 August 2009, Mvuemba signed a contract with FC Lorient after being released by Portsmouth.

He was signed by Lyon in summer 2012 for €3 million and €1 million variable. Mvuemba was released by  Lyon at the end of the 2015–16 season.

International career
Mvuemba made one appearance for the DR Congo national team in 2005.

Style of play
Mvuemba plays in central midfield normally as a playmaker in an attacking role. He came to prominence playing in this position alongside holding midfielder Lassana Diarra in the Toulon Tournament (U20) in July 2004.

According to Liverpool and England striker Peter Crouch, who was his team mate in Portsmouth, Mvuemba was the most talented player in the squad at the time but could not perform at his best due to nerves. Crouch wrote that Mvuemba was a "genius midfield playmaker who could turn invisible at the sound of a referee's whistle".

References

External links
 
 
 

1985 births
Living people
Sportspeople from Alençon
French footballers
French sportspeople of Democratic Republic of the Congo descent
France under-21 international footballers
Democratic Republic of the Congo international footballers
Democratic Republic of the Congo footballers
Association football midfielders
Stade Rennais F.C. players
Portsmouth F.C. players
FC Lorient players
Olympique Lyonnais players
Umm Salal SC players
K.S.V. Roeselare players
Ligue 1 players
Premier League players
Qatar Stars League players
Expatriate footballers in Belgium
Challenger Pro League players
Democratic Republic of the Congo expatriate footballers
French expatriate footballers
Democratic Republic of the Congo expatriate sportspeople in Belgium
Democratic Republic of the Congo expatriate sportspeople in France
Expatriate footballers in France
Expatriate footballers in England
Expatriate footballers in Qatar
Footballers from Normandy
Black French sportspeople